The 2024 United States presidential election in North Dakota is scheduled to take place on Tuesday, November 5, 2024, as part of the 2024 United States elections in which all 50 states plus the District of Columbia will participate. North Dakota voters will choose electors to represent them in the Electoral College via a popular vote. The state of North Dakota has three electoral votes in the Electoral College, following reapportionment due to the 2020 United States census in which the state neither gained nor lost a seat.

Primary elections

Republican caucuses 

The North Dakota Republican caucuses are scheduled to be held from March 29 to 31, 2024.

See also 
 United States presidential elections in North Dakota
 2024 United States presidential election
 2024 Democratic Party presidential primaries
 2024 Republican Party presidential primaries
 2024 United States elections

References 

North Dakota
2024
United States presidential